Nary Ly (born 6 June 1972) is a Cambodian long distance runner. She finished in last place in the 2016 Olympic marathon of the 133 athletes to complete the course.

References

External links
 

1972 births
Living people
Sportspeople from Phnom Penh
Cambodian female long-distance runners
Cambodian female marathon runners
Place of birth missing (living people)
Athletes (track and field) at the 2016 Summer Olympics
Olympic athletes of Cambodia